Kreshnik Spahiu (born April 21, 1969) is an Albanian lawyer and politician. In 1991, he graduated in Law from the University of Tirana. He is the founder and leader of the Red and Black Alliance since 2012. Between 2007 and 2012 he was head of the High Council of Justice of Albania until he resigned on 10 February.

References

External links
 Official website of the Red and Black Alliance

Red and Black Alliance politicians
1969 births
Living people
People from Tirana
University of Tirana alumni
20th-century Albanian lawyers
21st-century Albanian lawyers